|}

This is a list of electoral district results for the Victorian 1985 election for the Legislative Assembly.

Results by electoral district

Albert Park

Ballarat North

Ballarat South

Balwyn

Bellarine

Benalla

Benambra

Bendigo East

Bendigo West

Bennettswood

Bentleigh

Berwick

Box Hill

Brighton

Broadmeadows

Brunswick

Bulleen

Bundoora

Burwood

Carrum

Caulfield

Clayton

Coburg

Dandenong

Dandenong North

Derrimut

Doncaster

Doveton

Dromana

Essendon

Evelyn

Footscray

Forest Hill

Frankston North

Frankston South

Geelong

Geelong North

Gippsland East

Gippsland South

Gippsland West

Gisborne

Glen Waverley

Greensborough

Hawthorn

Ivanhoe

Keilor

Kew

Knox

Lowan

Malvern

Melbourne

Mentone 

 After the redistribution, Mentone became a notional Labor seat. Sitting Liberal member Bill Templeton did not manage to win it back.

Mildura

Mitcham

Monbulk

Mornington

Morwell

Murray Valley

Narracan 

 Narracan became a notionally Labor seat in the redistribution before the election. However, the Liberal candidate won it back.

Niddrie

Northcote

Oakleigh

Pascoe Vale

Polwarth

Portland

Prahran

Preston

Reservoir

Richmond

Ringwood

Ripon

Rodney

St Albans

St Kilda

Sandringham

Shepparton

South Barwon

Springvale

Sunshine

Swan Hill 

 The two candidate preferred vote was not counted between the Liberal and National candidates for Swan Hill.

Syndal

Thomastown

Wantirna

Warrandyte

Warrnambool

Werribee

Whittlesea

Williamstown

See also 

 1985 Victorian state election
 Members of the Victorian Legislative Assembly, 1985–1988

References 

Results of Victorian state elections
1980s in Victoria (Australia)